The George Strait albums discography consists of 30 studio albums, three live albums, and 11 compilation albums by American country music singer George Strait. Of these albums, 36 have received a certification of at least Gold from the Recording Industry Association of America, and five reached No.1 on the Billboard 200.  His highest-certified album is the 1992 release Pure Country, which is certified sextuple-platinum for U.S. shipments of six million copies; his highest overall is the 1995 box set Strait Out of the Box, which is certified octuple platinum. Of his studio albums, all but George Strait (2000), Twang (2009), Here for a Good Time (2011), Love Is Everything (2013), and Cold Beer Conversation (2015) are certified platinum or higher.  As of June 2014, he has sold 45 million albums in the US since 1991 when SoundScan started tracking album sales, and has amassed more top 10 albums than any other artist in that time.

Studio albums

1981–1990

1991–2000

2001–2010

2011–present

Compilations

1981–2000

2001–present

Live albums

Christmas albums

Soundtracks

Notes

A ^ Beyond the Blue Neon also peaked at number 5 on the RPM Country Albums chart in Canada.
B ^ Unable to chart due to being only available at one retailer (Hallmark Gold Crown).

References

Country music discographies
 
Discographies of American artists